The 1997–98 Scottish First Division was won by Dundee who were promoted 5 points ahead of runner up Falkirk.

Promotion and relegation from 1996–97
Promoted from First Division to Premier Division
Ayr United
Hamilton Academical

Relegated from Premier Division to First Division
Raith Rovers

Table

Top scorers

References

See also
1997–98 in Scottish football

1997-96
Scot
2